Sir Stephen John Hill, (June 10, 1809 – 20 October 1891) was a governor of, in turn, four British colonial possessions.

Born in the West Indies, Hill began his colonial service in Africa, becoming governor of the Gold Coast (modern Ghana) in 1851. In 1854 he became governor of Sierra Leone.  From 1860 through 1861 he was made governor of Sierra Leone for a second time. Then in 1863 he was appointed governor of the Leeward Islands and Antigua. In 1869 Hill became governor of Newfoundland, continuing in that position until 1876. He provided valuable guidance to the colony during the period following their rejection of participation in Canadian Confederation. Hill took up residency in Anguilla in November of 1885 and left in February of 1888.

Hill died in 1891 in London, England.

See also
 Governors of Newfoundland
 List of people of Newfoundland and Labrador
 List of colonial governors of Sierra Leone

External links
Biography at Government House The Governorship of Newfoundland and Labrador
 

1809 births
1891 deaths
Companions of the Order of the Bath
Knights Commander of the Order of St Michael and St George
Governors of Newfoundland Colony
Governors of Sierra Leone
Governors of Antigua and Barbuda
Governors of the Leeward Islands
Governors of the Gold Coast (British colony)